Yesenia Valencia (born 16 March 1991) is a Guatemalan recurve archer. She competed in the individual recurve event at the 2015 World Archery Championships in Copenhagen, Denmark.

References

External links

Guatemalan female archers
Living people
1991 births
Archers at the 2015 Pan American Games
Pan American Games competitors for Guatemala